Round Grove Township may refer to:

Round Grove Township, Livingston County, Illinois
Round Grove Township, White County, Indiana
Round Grove Township, McLeod County, Minnesota
Round Grove Township, Macon County, Missouri
Round Grove Township, Marion County, Missouri

Township name disambiguation pages